Edward John Slattery (born 23 March 1937) is a former Australian rules footballer who played with Footscray in the Victorian Football League (VFL).

Biography
Slattery, a forward from Eaglehawk, had his most productive season in 1961 when he kicked 25 goals from his 13 appearances. This included a four-goal haul in Footscray's preliminary final win over Melbourne. He then lined up at full-forward in the 1961 VFL Grand Final but didn't kick a goal and finished on the losing team.

He had a brother, Kevin Slattery, who played briefly for North Melbourne.

References

1937 births
Australian rules footballers from Victoria (Australia)
Western Bulldogs players
Eaglehawk Football Club players
Living people